Kbang is a township and capital of Kbang District, Gia Lai Province, Vietnam.

References

Populated places in Gia Lai province
District capitals in Vietnam
Communes of Gia Lai province
Townships in Vietnam